Henry IX (107513 December 1126), called the Black, a member of the House of Welf, was Duke of Bavaria from 1120 to 1126.

Life and reign
Henry was the second son of Duke Welf I of Bavaria (died 1101) from his marriage with Judith, daughter of Count Baldwin IV of Flanders. As a young man, he administered the family's Este property south of the Alps.

Through his marriage to Wulfhilde, daughter of Duke Magnus of Saxony, about 1095, he acquired part of the Billung estates around Lüneburg (the nucleus of the later Welf duchy of Brunswick-Lüneburg). He aspired to succeed his father-in-law as Saxon duke when Magnus died without male heirs in 1106, but was denied as the new king Henry V enfeoffed his follower Count Lothair of Supplinburg.

Duke Henry nevertheless upheld close relations with the ruling Salian dynasty. In 1116, he joined Emperor Henry V's second Italian campaign to seize the estates of late Margravine Matilda of Tuscany. He succeeded his elder brother Welf II as Bavarian duke, when the latter died childless in 1120. Henry was also instrumental in bringing about the 1122 Concordat of Worms, ending the long-lasting Investiture Controversy between Pope and Emperor.

In the early 1120s, Henry commissioned the Genealogia Welforum, a family history in Latin, composed at Weingarten Abbey. He may have been prompted by the canonization of Bishop Conrad of Constance in 1123. Conrad was a Welf and his canonization stimulated Henry's interest in his ancestors. At the same time, Henry made an inventory of his family's tombs.

Duke Henry played a vital role in the royal election of 1125: first supporting his son-in-law, the Hohenstaufen duke Frederick II of Swabia, he switched his allegiance to his old rival Duke Lothair of Saxony—probably after Lothair promised that Gertrude, his only daughter and heir, would marry Henry's son Henry the Proud. The marriage was concluded in May 1127. The estrangement between the Welf and Hohenstaufen dynasties ("Guelphs and Ghibellines") lasted until the 13th century.

After Lothair won the tumultuous election, he imposed an Imperial ban on Frederick II, however, the king's forces were not able to conquer the Hohenstaufen territories in Swabia. In 1126 Henry abdicated as Bavarian duke in favour of his second son Henry the Proud and retired to the family foundation of Weingarten Abbey in Upper Swabia, possibly to not be obliged to participate in the prosecution of his son-in-law.

Henry died shortly thereafter and was buried in Weingarten. His wife Wulfhilde outlived him by only 16 days. Henry's epithet "the Black" has not been recorded before the 13th century. Both Emperor Frederick Barbarossa and his bitter rival Henry the Lion were his grandsons.

Issue
Henry and Wulfhilde had the following children:
Judith, married Frederick II, Duke of Swabia
Conrad (died 17 March 1126)
Henry X the Proud, married Gertrude of Süpplingenburg, succeeded his father as Duke of Bavaria
Welf VI (died 1191)
Sophia, married Berthold III, Duke of Zähringen and secondly Margrave Leopold of Styria
Wulfhild, married Rudolf I, Count of Bregenz
Mathilde, married Diepold IV, Margrave of Vohburg and Count Gebhard III of Sulzbach
Adalbert, Abbot of Corvey

References

Sources

Literature 
 Bernd Schneidmüller: Die Welfen. Herrschaft und Erinnerung (819–1252) (= Urban-Taschenbücher 465). Kohlhammer Verlag, Stuttgart etc.,  2000, pp. 149 ff.

External links 

 Deed of Henry IX for Ranshofen Abbey, 30 July 1125, 

1075 births
1126 deaths
12th-century dukes of Bavaria
House of Welf
11th-century German nobility
Burials at Weingarten Abbey